The Croatian Defence Forces ( or HOS) were the paramilitary arm of the Croatian Party of Rights (HSP) from 1991 to 1992, during the first stages of the Yugoslav wars. During the Croatian War of Independence, the HOS organized several early companies and participated in Croatia's defense. At the peak of the war in Croatia, the HOS was several battalions in size. The first HOS units were headed by Ante Paradžik, a HSP member who was killed by Croatian police in September 1991. Which is accredited to a growing disregard for the ethnic Herzeg-Croat population which consisted of both Roman Catholics and Sunni Muslims in the unrecognized territory of Herzeg-Bosnia, and thus the mutiny of the HOS. This is generally credited to the first Croatian President Franjo Tuđman commanding such operations due to a disregard for Bosnian-Croat friendship during the war. After the November 1991 general mobilization in Croatia and the January 1992 cease-fire, the HOS was absorbed by the Croatian Army.

The HOS units in Bosnia and Herzegovina consisted of Croats, Bosniaks and foreign volunteers led by Blaž Kraljević. On 9 August 1992, Kraljević and eight staff members were assassinated by Croatian Defence Council (HVO) soldiers under the command of Mladen Naletilić. The HOS was disbanded shortly afterwards, and absorbed by the HVO and the Army of the Republic of Bosnia and Herzegovina at the beginning of the Croat-Bosniak War. The last HOS unit was dissolved on 5 April 1993 in central Bosnia.

History

Croatia

Origin
The Croatian Party of Rights was reestablished in Croatia on 26 February 1990, with Dobroslav Paraga president and Ante Paradžik vice-president. The Croatian civilian population began arming itself, and on 21 December 1990 the Serbs of Croatia rose up; soon, the Yugoslav People's Army combined with the insurgent Serbs and the Croatian Party of Rights considered forming its own military wing.

Although the first HOS squad was established in January, the HOS was officially founded on 25 June 1991 by Dobroslav Paraga, Ante Paradžik, Alija Šiljak and other leaders of the HSP. Soon after the establishment of the HOS general staff, Paradžik became its chief. The general staff was at Starčević Center, the HSP headquarters in Zagreb. At first, the HOS was poorly armed and its soldiers used their own weapons. However, they performed well in conflicts with Serb forces and attracted the attention of Croatian public. The HSP received donations from the Croatian diaspora and HSP branches in Australia and Canada, enabling them to buy weapons and increase their membership. Not every HSP member supported a military wing, and secretary Krešimir Pavelić left the party in protest.

Many HOS recruits came from the diaspora: Bosnia and Herzegovina and overseas. In addition, HOS attracted trained soldiers from abroad.

The HOS used the roman salute and wore black uniforms; its headquarters featured portraits of Ustaše leaders and its units were named after Ustaša generals. Their outward association with WWII-era fascists prompted worries to the Croatian government who feared their image would damage Croatia's international reputation. By early 1992 they were disbanded and recruited into the regular Croatian Army.

Battles
At the beginning of the Croatian War of Independence, the HOS consisted of about 6,000 soldiers. Although they were members of the Croatian National Guard (ZNG), they obeyed orders from HOS officers. Because of an unwritten rule that HOS members could only be members of the HSP, the HOS was considered a party paramilitary organization.
The HOS and the ZNG were involved in the Battle of the Barracks and other minor battles in Croatia. The HOS increased in popularity within the HSP, and soon the HOS were in nearly every town where the HSP was active. On 10 September 1991, Paraga and Paradžik organized a demonstration of an HOS company for 10,000 spectators in Jelačić Square. Shortly after the demonstration, the company was involved in the Battle of Vukovar under Robert Šilić.

At this time, HOS units were founded in Dalmatia. Until May 1991, Dalmatian HOS units were company-sized. In an agreement between Paraga and the Slovene Minister of Defense Janez Janša, the units were sent to Slovenia for training. By October 1991 the unit had grown to battalion size; it was called the 9th Battalion (the Rafael "Knight" Boban Battalion) and was commanded by Jozo Radanović, president of the HSP branch in Split. This unit became one of the most popular Croatian units; in early December 1991, Radanović was promoted to colonel in the HOS.

Paradžik was shot at a police checkpoint near Zagreb on 21 September 1991, in what was described by the authorities as an accident. On 23 November the Croatian government began a general mobilization, and most HOS militiamen joined Croatian Army units. Shortly after the cease-fire in January 1992, the HOS ceased operations in Croatia.

Bosnia and Herzegovina

The Croatian Defence Forces in Bosnia and Herzegovina had its headquarters in Ljubuški and mostly operated in the southern area of the country. Their commander was Blaž Kraljević. In the beginning of the Bosnian War they fought against the Serb forces together with the HVO and ARBiH. The strength of HOS forces in Bosnia and Herzegovina was estimated at up to 5000 members armed with infantry weapons. They included many Bosnian Muslims in their ranks and advocated a confederation between Croatia and Bosnia and Herzegovina, frequently using the slogan "Croatia to the Drina, Bosnia to the Adriatic". The HOS participated in breaking the JNA-VRS siege of Mostar in June 1992, when the HV and HVO forces pushed the Serb forces towards eastern Herzegovina.

Relations between the HVO and HOS eventually worsened, though HOS did not function integrally throughout the country. In the area of Novi Travnik it was closer to the HVO, while in the Mostar area there were increasingly tense relations between the HOS and the HVO. On 9 August Kraljević was killed in unclear circumstances at a police checkpoint in the village of Kruševo, by HVO soldiers under the command of Mladen Naletilić. On 23 August 1992 HVO and HOS leaders in Herzegovina agreed to incorporate the HOS into the HVO. The remaining HOS forces were later recognized by the Sarajevo government as part of the ARBiH. The HOS forces in central Bosnia merged with the HVO in April 1993. Most of the Bosniaks that were members of the HOS joined the Muslim Armed Forces (MOS).

Symbols
The HOS had a black flag with its emblem in the centre: a circle of triple wattle containing a chequered shield (with white first square) over a four-sided blue-and-white triple-wattle symbol; above, the inscription "HOS"; below, "HSP, Za dom spremni", which was the Ustaše salute during WW2, in the Independent State of Croatia.

HOS symbols have become a contentious issue in recent years as the popularity of its flag with the Za Dom Spremni slogan has grown with right-wing fans at sporting events and HOS veterans continue to use HOS and Ustasha insignia at public events.

Units

Gallery

See also
Blaž Kraljević
Croatian Party of Rights

Footnotes

References

 

 
 
 

Croatian nationalist organizations
Military units and formations of the Croatian War of Independence
Military units and formations of the Bosnian War
Anti-communist organizations
Military units and formations established in 1991
Military units and formations disestablished in 1993
Military wings of political parties
1991 establishments in Croatia
1991 establishments in Bosnia and Herzegovina
Paramilitary organizations based in Croatia
Paramilitary organizations in the Yugoslav Wars
Far-right politics in Croatia
Croatian irredentism